Eurycleia are figures in Greek mythology.

Eurycleia may also refer to:

 195 Eurykleia, a main belt asteroid
 H. a. eurycleia, a subspecies of butterfly species Heliconius aoede
 Eurycleia, a crater on Tethys (moon of Saturn)